Tomoplagia phaedra is a species of tephritid or fruit flies in the genus Tomoplagia of the family Tephritidae.

Distribution
Peru, Argentina, Brazil.

References

Tephritinae
Insects described in 1914
Diptera of South America